The Zhongming Formation is a palaeontological formation located in China. It dates to the Devonian period.

See also 
 List of fossil sites

References
  (1993); Wildlife of Gondwana. Reed. 

Geologic formations of China
Devonian System of Asia
Devonian China
Paleontology in China